Empathogens or entactogens are a class of psychoactive drugs that produce experiences of emotional communion, oneness, relatedness, emotional openness—that is, empathy or sympathy—as particularly observed and reported for experiences with 3,4-methylenedioxymethamphetamine (MDMA).  This class of drug is distinguished from the classes of hallucinogen or psychedelic, and amphetamine or stimulants. Major members of this class include MDMA, MDA, MDEA, MDOH, MBDB, 5-APB, 5-MAPB, 6-APB, 6-MAPB, methylone, mephedrone, GHB, αMT, and αET, MDAI among others. Most entactogens are phenethylamines and amphetamines, although several, such as αMT and αET, are tryptamines. When referring to MDMA and its counterparts, the term MDxx is often used (with the exception of MDPV). Entactogens are sometimes incorrectly referred to as hallucinogens or stimulants, although many entactogens such as ecstasy exhibit psychedelic or stimulant properties as well.

Etymology
The term empathogen, meaning "generating a state of empathy", was coined in 1983–84 by Ralph Metzner as a term to denote a therapeutic class of drugs that includes MDMA and phenethylamine relatives. David E. Nichols later rejected this initial terminology and adopted, instead, the term entactogen, meaning "producing a touching within", to denote this class of drugs, asserting a concern with the potential for improper association of the term empathogen with negative connotations related to the Greek root πάθος páthos ("suffering; passion"). Additionally, Nichols wanted to avoid any association with the term pathogenesis.
Nichols also thought the original term was limiting, and did not cover other therapeutic uses for the drugs that go beyond instilling feelings of empathy. The hybrid word entactogen is derived from the roots en, tactus and -gen. Entactogen is becoming dominant in usage, and, despite their difference in connotation, they are essentially interchangeable, as they refer to precisely the same chemicals.

Psychological effects
Both terms adopted and used in naming the class of therapeutic drugs for MDMA and related compounds were chosen with the intention of providing some reflection of the reported psychological effects associated with drugs in the classification and distinguishing these compounds from classical psychedelic drugs such as LSD, mescaline, and psilocybin and major stimulants, such as methamphetamine and amphetamine. Chemically, MDMA is classified as a substituted amphetamine (which includes stimulants like dextroamphetamine and psychedelics like 2,5-dimethoxy-4-methylamphetamine), which makes MDMA a substituted phenethylamine (which includes other stimulants like methylphenidate and other psychedelics like mescaline) by the definition of amphetamine. While chemically related both to psychedelics and stimulants, the psychological effects experienced with MDMA were reported to provide obvious and striking aspects of personal relatedness, feelings of connectedness, communion with others, and ability to feel what others feel—in short an empathic resonance is consistently evoked. While psychedelics like LSD may sometimes yield effects of empathic resonance, these effects tend to be momentary and likely passed over on the way to some other dimension or interest. In contrast, the main characteristic that distinguishes MDMA from LSD-type experiences is the consistency of the effects of emotional communion, relatedness, emotional openness—in short, empathy and sympathy.

Examples

The chemicals below have a varying degree of entactogenic effects; some of them induce additional effects, including serenic effects, stimulant effects, antidepressant effects, anxiolytic effects, and psychedelic effects.

Phenethylamines
 (2,5-dimethoxy-4-bromophenethylamine) (2C-B)

Substituted amphetamines
 5-(2-Aminopropyl)-2,3-dihydro-1H-indene (5-APDI, IAP)
 6-(2-Aminopropyl)benzofuran (6-APB) (benzofury)
 5-(2-aminopropyl)benzofuran (5-APB)
 5-(2-methylaminopropyl)benzofuran (5-MAPB)
 Methylbenzodioxolylbutanamine (MBDB)
 Methylenedioxyamphetamine (MDA)
 Methylenedioxyethylamphetamine (MDEA)
 Methylenedioxymethamphetamine (MDMA)
 Methylenedioxyhydroxyamphetamine (MDOH)
 4-Fluoroamphetamine (4-FA)
Substituted aminorexes
 4,4'-Dimethylaminorex (4,4'-DMAR)
 Methylenedioxy-4-methylaminorex (MDMAR)
Cathinones
 Mephedrone (4-MMC)
 3-Methylmethcathinone (3-MMC, metaphedrone)
 Methylone (βk-MDMA)
 Butylone (βk-MBDB)
 Flephedrone (4-FMC)

Tryptamines
 α-Ethyltryptamine (αET)
 α-Methyltryptamine (αMT)

Aminoindanes
 5-Iodo-2-aminoindane (5-IAI)
 Methylenedioxyaminoindane (MDAI)

Therapeutic uses 
Psychiatrists began using entactogens as psychotherapy tools in the 1970s despite the lack of clinical trials. In recent years, the scientific community has been revisiting the possible therapeutic uses of entactogens. Therapeutic models using MDMA have been studied because of its entactogenic properties. This type of therapy would be applicable for treating a patient who was experiencing psychological trauma such as PTSD. Traumatic memories can be linked to fear in the patients which makes engaging with these memories difficult. Administration of an entactogen such as MDMA allows the patient to disconnect from the fear associated with the traumatic memories and engage in therapy. MDMA acts by targeting the body's stress response in order to cause this therapeutic effect. In addition to reducing anxiety and a conditioned fear response, MDMA also reduces the avoidance of feelings. Patients are then able to trust themselves and their therapist and engage with traumatic memories under the influence of MDMA.

Although the therapeutic effects of entactogens may be promising, drugs such as MDMA have the potential for negative effects that are counter productive in a therapy setting. For example, MDMA may make negative cognition worse. This means that a positive experience is not a guarantee and can be contingent on aspects like the setting and the patient's expectations. Additionally there is no clear model of the psychopharmacological means for a positive or negative experience.  There is also a potential concern for the neurotoxic effects of MDMA on the fiber density of serotonin neurons in the neocortex. High doses of MDMA may cause potential depletion of serotonergic axons. The same effects may not be caused by lower doses of MDMA required for treatment, however.

References

Bibliography
 Nichols, D.E., Hoffman, A.J., Oberlender, R.A., Jacob P 3rd & Shulgin A.T. Derivatives of 1-(1,3-benzodioxol-5-yl)-2-butanamine: representatives of a novel therapeutic class 1986 J Med Chem 29 2009-15
 Nichols, D.E.  Entactogens: How the Name for A novel Class of Psychoactive Agents Originated Frontiers in Psychiatry 2022, 3, Online March 25, (2022), DOI: 10.3389/fpsyt.2022.863088

External links